David Tamiru Beshah (born 20 July 1987) is a former professional footballer who played as a defensive midfielder. Born in Germany, he made one appearance for the Ethiopia national team in 2014.

Career
Beshah was born in Cologne, Germany. He played for 1. FC Köln, Alemannia Aachen, Fortuna Köln and Germania Dürwiß at youth level.

In 2013 Beshah took part in a training camp of the Ethiopia national team for the Africa Cup of Nations but did not make the final squad for tournament. His performances at the camp caught the attention of scouts and he moved to Ethiopian Premier League club Ethiopian Coffee in the same year. He spent two years at Ethiopian Coffee before establishing a football consulting company in Addis Ababa.

References

External links
 
 

Living people
1987 births
Sportspeople from Cologne
Ethiopian footballers
Association football midfielders
Ethiopia international footballers
Ethiopian Premier League players
Ethiopian Coffee S.C. players
Footballers from Cologne